Route 161 is a highway in northeastern Missouri.  Its northern terminus is at Business U.S. Route 61 in Bowling Green; its southern terminus is at Interstate 70/U.S. Route 40 south of Montgomery City.

Route description

History
Missouri Route 161 was formerly known as Route 29.

Major intersections

References

161
Transportation in Montgomery County, Missouri
Transportation in Pike County, Missouri